Jogulamba district is a district in the Indian state of Telangana. The administrative headquarters of the district is located at Gadwal. The district shares boundaries with Narayanpet, Wanaparthy districts and with the state boundary of Andhra Pradesh and Karnataka. The district was carved out from Mahabubnagar district in 2016.

Administrative divisions 

The district has one revenue division, Gadwal, and is sub-divided into 12 mandals.

Mandals

Demographics 

The district has a population of 6,09,990 of which 3,09,274 are males and 3,00,716 females. Urban population is 63,177 (10.36%). Scheduled Castes and Scheduled Tribes made up 120,639 (19.77%) and 9376 (1.54%) of the population respectively.

At the time of the 2011 census, 90.09% of the population spoke Telugu and 7.49% Urdu as their first language.

See also 
 List of districts in Telangana

References

External links 

 Official website

Districts of Telangana
Jogulamba Gadwal district
Mandals in Jogulamba Gadwal district